Falling Mirror was an alternative rock band from Cape Town, South Africa founded in 1978 by cousins Allan Faull and Nielen Marais.

Allan Faull died in September 2013.

Discography

Singles
"I Am The Actor" / "Makin' Out With Granny" (1979) Warner Brothers, WBS 722
"Highway Blues" (1979)
"If I Was James Dean" (1980) also released by WEA Europe
"Neutron Bop" (1980)
"Johnny Calls The Chemist" (1986)
"Let's Paint The House Pink"
"Cosmic Night" (aka Louise The Astronaut) (1986) Warner Brothers, WBS 775
"As Sly As The Fox"
"Encounter In A Takeaway Shop" (1987) WEA France (12" 45rpm single, 258426-0)

Albums
    Zen Boulders (1979) WEA Records, WBC 9011
    The Storming Of The Loft (1980) WEA Records, WBC 9013
    Fantasy Kid (1981) WEA Records, WBC 9021
    Johnny Calls The Chemist (1986) WEA Records, WBC 9029
    Shattered (compilation LP) (1989) Tusk, TUSB 3008
    Shattered (CD re-issue with 3 bonus tracks) (1992) Tusk, TUCD 3008
    Hammerhead Hotel (download-only, November 2006, recorded 1996) Spaced Out Sounds
    Johnny Calls The Chemist (CD re-issue with bonus tracks) (May 2001) RetroFresh, freshcd 112
    Zen Boulders / The Storming Of The Loft (2 for 1 CD re-issue) (August 2002) RetroFresh, freshcd124
    Singles and Rarities (Virtual Collection, compiled by Brian Currin) (September 2008) Spaced Out Sounds
    Special Agent Duck (December 2010) Spaced Out Sounds

Various artist compilations
    Sharp Cuts Volume 1 [1992] Tusk, WOND 103
    Sharp Cuts Volume 2 [1994] Tusk, WOND 121
    40 Single Hits 40 Hit Singles Volume 2 [1997] Sony Music, CDSM 010 Z
    SA Top 40 Hits Of All Time Volume 6 [2002] Sting Music, STIDFCD 037
    SA Rock Gold (3-CD set) [2010] Universal Music, TUMGCD 100

Guest appearances (Allan Faull)
    McCully Workshop Inc [1970], Trutone
    Buccaneer - McCully Workshop [1998] MicMac, MS001

References

Musical groups established in 1978
South African alternative rock groups